Channel 15 or TV15 may refer to:

 NewsWatch 15, a regional cable news television network based in New Orleans, Louisiana
 Pink 15, a former Macedonian private television channel
 La Tele (Peruvian TV network), formerly Uranio 15, a peruvian free-to-air television channel
 Canal 15 (Nicaraguan TV channel), a television channel in Nicaragua

Canada
The following television stations operate on virtual channel 15 in Canada:
 CIVK-DT in Carleton, Quebec
 CIVQ-DT in Quebec City, Quebec
 CKMI-DT-1 in Montreal, Quebec

Mexico
The following television stations broadcast on digital channel 15 (UHF frequencies covering 476-482 MHz) in Mexico:
 XHCRO-TDT in Carbó, Sonora 
 XHCTCY-TDT in Querétaro, Querétaro
 XHFA-TDT in Nogales, Sonora 
 XHOCH-TDT in Ojinaga, Chihuahua
 XHOQT-TDT in Oquitoa, Sonora
 XHRON-TDT in Rayón, Sonora 
 XHSAS-TDT in Santa Ana, Sonora 
 XHVTV-TDT in Matamoros, Tamaulipas

The following television stations operate on virtual channel 15 in Mexico:

Regional networks
Telemax in the state of Sonora

Local stations
XHSDD-TDT in Sabinas, Coahuila
XHFGL-TDT and XHRCSP-TDT in Durango and Santiago Papasquiaro, Durango
XHCEP-TDT in Celaya, Guanajuato
XHCMO-TDT in Cuernavaca, Morelos
XHRIO-TDT in Matamoros, Tamaulipas
XHZAC-TDT in Zacatecas, Zacatecas

See also
 Channel 15 TV stations in Canada
 Channel 15 branded TV stations in the United States
 Channel 15 digital TV stations in the United States
 Channel 15 low-power TV stations in the United States
 Channel 15 virtual TV stations in the United States

15